Martin Felton is a former association football player who represented New Zealand at international level.

Felton played two official A-international matches for the New Zealand in 1984, both against Pacific minnows Fiji, the first a 2–1 win on 18 October, the second two days later a 1–1 draw on 20 October 1984.

References

External links
 

Year of birth missing (living people)
Living people
Papatoetoe AFC players
New Zealand association footballers
New Zealand international footballers
Association football defenders